The Central District of Saveh County is a district (bakhsh) in Saveh County, Markazi Province, Iran. At the 2006 census, its population was 215,413, in 57,202 families.  The District has two cities: Saveh & Aveh. The District has four rural districts (dehestan): Nur Ali Beyk Rural District, Qareh Chay Rural District, Shahsavan Kandi Rural District, and Taraznahid Rural District.

References 

Saveh County
Districts of Markazi Province